Allvar Gullstrand (5 June 1862 – 28 July 1930) was a Swedish ophthalmologist and optician.

Life 
Born at Landskrona, Sweden, Gullstrand was professor (1894–1927) successively of eye therapy and of optics at the University of Uppsala. He applied the methods of physical mathematics to the study of optical images and of the refraction of light in the eye. For this work, he received the Nobel Prize in Physiology or Medicine in 1911.

Gullstrand is noted also for his research on astigmatism and for improving the ophthalmoscope and corrective lenses for use after removal of a cataract from the eye.

He was elected a member of the Royal Swedish Academy of Sciences in 1905, and served on the Academy's Prize Committee for Physics. While serving on the committee, he used his position to block Albert Einstein from receiving a Nobel Prize in Physics for his theory of relativity, which Allvar believed to be wrong.

Gullstrand married Signe Breitholtz (1862–1946) in 1885.

Due to the mathematical content of Gullstand's writing, Horatio Burt Williams lamented in 1926 that "there are few ophthalmologists and not many physiologists who are able to read [Gullstrand's papers] and for the same reason that the chemists of Gibbs' day were unable to read his work."

Gullstrand died in Stockholm in 1930, where he was interred at Norra begravningsplatsen.

Works
 1904: "Zur Kenntnis der Kreispunkte", Acta Mathematica 29:59–100.
 1906: "Vie réelle optische Abbildung", Kungl. Svenska Vetenskapsakademiens Handlingar 41 
 1908: "Die optische Abbildung im heterogenen Medien und die Dioptrik der Kristal-linse des Menschen", Kungl. Svenska Vetenskapsakademiens Handlingar 43
 1905: "Über Astigmatismus, Koma und Aberration", Annalen der Physik,(4), 18: 941-973
 1907: "Tatsachen und Fiktionen in der Lehre von der optischen Abbildung", Archiv für Optik, vol.1 p. 2;
 1911: Speech at the Nobel Banquet in Stockholm, December 10, 1911
 1919: "Preparation of non spherical surfaces for optical instruments", Kgl. Svenska Vetenskapsakademiens Handlingar, vol. 60: 155, abstracted in Zeitschrift für Instrumentenkunde, vol. 41 (1921), pp. 123–25
 1922: "Allgemeine Lösung des statischen Einkörperproblems in der Einsteinschen Gravitationstheorie", Arkiv för Matematik, Astronomi och Fysik 16(8):1–15

See also
Corneal topography
Gullstrand–Painlevé coordinates
Optical aberration
Perceptual paradox
Slit lamp

References

  including the Nobel Lecture December 11, 1911 How I Found the Mechanism of Intracapsular Accommodation
 Maximilian Herzberger (1960) "Allvar Gullstrand", Journal of Modern Optics 7:237–41.
 Ian R. Porteous (2001) Geometric Differentiation, pp 201,205,271,285, Cambridge University Press  .
 Frank Tsai (2009) Who was Allvar Gullstrand from Pearls in Ophthalmology.

External links
Nobel stamps

1862 births
1930 deaths
People from Landskrona Municipality
Swedish ophthalmologists
Swedish Nobel laureates
Opticians
Uppsala University alumni
Academic staff of Uppsala University
Members of the Royal Swedish Academy of Sciences
Nobel laureates in Physiology or Medicine
19th-century Swedish physicians
20th-century Swedish physicians
Burials at Norra begravningsplatsen
Optical physicists
19th century in Skåne County